The Canal de la Sensée is a canal in northern France. The project was developed under Napoleon. In March 1806, the imperial government gave orders to build a canal which would link the Scarpe River and the Escaut River. The work was commenced under the direction of Augustin Honnorez in June 1819 and the Sensée canal was opened to navigation in November 1820. At that time the boats were pulled by men or horses working for boat employers. Shortly after World War I 1914-1918, horses were replaced by tractors.

The Canal de la Sensée forms part of the Canal Dunkerque-Escaut route.

See also
 Sensée River
 List of canals in France

References

External links
Project Babel
Ecoleslanoy.free.fr
Map
 Grand Gabarit guide Places, ports and moorings on the canal(s).

Canals in France
Buildings and structures in Nord (French department)
Canals opened in 1820